Abella is a Spanish and French surname. Notable people with the surname include:

Alicia Abella, American engineer
Carlos Abella (born 1986), Colombian footballer
Damià Abella (born 1982), Spanish footballer
Irving Abella (1940–2022), Canadian writer
José Abella (born 1994), Mexican football player
Rosalie Abella (born 1946), Canadian Supreme Court jurist
Isaac Abella (1934-2016), Canadian physicist

See also
Abela (surname)